KAAL (channel 6) is a television station licensed to Austin, Minnesota, United States, serving as the ABC affiliate for Southeast Minnesota and Northern Iowa. The station is owned by Hubbard Broadcasting, and maintains studios in the TJ Maxx-anchored shopping center on Salem Road in Rochester, Minnesota, with a secondary studio on 10th Place Northeast in Austin. Its transmitter is located in Grand Meadow Township.

In addition to its main signal, KAAL operates a low-power translator licensed to Mason City, Iowa. This airs a digital signal on UHF channel 33 from a transmitter in Garner, Iowa along US 18.

History
The station signed on the air on August 17, 1953 as KMMT and aired an analog signal on VHF channel 6. Its first owners were local businessmen Martin Busted, Harry Smith, and Palmer Ulland, who also owned KAUS radio (AM 1480 and FM 99.9). Originally, the station was a primary CBS affiliate with secondary ABC and DuMont relations. After KGLO-TV (channel 3, now KIMT) launched from Mason City in late 1954, KMMT switched its primary affiliation to ABC. DuMont would eventually be dropped in 1956 after that network shut down operations. This station is the longest-tenured ABC affiliate in the Upper Midwest.

During the late-1950s, the station was also briefly affiliated with the NTA Film Network. It shared studios with KAUS radio on MN 105 in Austin where the two radio stations continue to operate today. The television station produced a few local programs most notably The Family Hour hosted by Christian pastor Joe Matt. The program aired until April 2001 and was one of the longest-running, locally produced religious shows in the United States.

KMMT and KAUS radio were purchased by Waterloo, Iowa-based Blackhawk Broadcasting in 1958. The station would add color television in 1967. Its call letters became KAUS-TV (for Austin) on June 1 of the same year to match its radio sisters. The outlet would begin carrying the yearly Jerry Lewis MDA Labor Day Telethon in 1973 and remained the area's affiliate until the event ended its run in 2015. KAUS-AM-FM-TV separated operations in 1974 after the television station moved to its current location on 10th Place Northeast along I-90. The building previously housed a Volkswagen dealership and showroom. The call letters were changed to the current KAAL-TV on November 19, 1974 referring to Austin and Albert Lea.  Blackhawk sold KAAL to the News-Press & Gazette Company of St. Joseph, Missouri in 1980.

In December 1985, Dix Communications acquired the station and the new company added stereo programming in November 1990. Another ownership change occurred in 1997 after Grapevine Communications of Atlanta purchased KAAL. It would eventually drop the use of the "-TV" suffix on September 23, 1998. Grapevine, in turn, divested the station to GOCOM on January 1, 2000. Exactly a year later, current owner Hubbard Broadcasting assumed control. The year 2001 also saw the launch of KAAL's digital signal on UHF channel 33. KAAL's broadcasts became digital-only, effective June 12, 2009.

Its previous digital allotment would eventually be used to sign-on a fill-in translator to cover Mason City. During the analog era, its signal used an FM audio carrier which could be heard at 87.75 in areas where the video signal could be received (and some where it could not). The same practice was true of all analog channel 6 television stations in North America. However, this analog FM carrier no longer exists for full-powered stations after the conversion to digital-only transmission.

At 8 p.m. on June 17, 2009, Austin was struck by an EF2 tornado in the city's north side. It passed one half mile to the north of KAAL's studios. This tornado was powerful enough to take out power for the entire city including this station. However, it continued to cover the severe weather event with a backup generator only able to power a few lights, computers, and camera set up in the weather center. The station would remain without electricity until 2 p.m. the next day. Normal operations resumed with the 5 p.m. newscast on June 18. The EF2 tornado caused structural damage to buildings on the north side of the city from US 218 near 4th Street Northwest to the golf country club.

Programming

Syndicated programming
Syndicated programming includes The Kelly Clarkson Show, Hot Bench and The Rachael Ray Show among others.

News operation

Local news, weather, and sports have been provided on the station since its first day of broadcasting in 1953. Under News-Press & Gazette Company control in the early-1980s, its news department was significantly expanded complete with new equipment for live reporting from the field. Since KIMT is licensed to the Iowa side of the market, it has traditionally focused coverage on that state compared with the area's other stations (KAAL and KTTC, channel 10) which are based in Minnesota.

Most of KAAL's technical operations are currently based at its studios in Austin. However, it also operates a full facility on Salem Road in Rochester that allows the station to have a solid presence in that area as opposed to a smaller bureau. For several years during its weeknight newscasts, KAAL maintained special technology to offer the unique practice of producing live newscasts from its Rochester studios while also featuring live weather forecasts and sports highlights originating from the Austin studios. As of February 2015, KAAL has moved all of its studio operations to their building on Salem Road in Rochester, and feed it back to their main broadcast operation in Austin where it is sent to their broadcast transmitters. As of February 2022, KAAL's master control has been hubbed at sister station KSTP-TV in St. Paul, completing the departure of the station from Austin.

Notable former on-air staff
Ross Becker – morning anchor; now CEO of TVnewsmentor.com
Butch Stearns – sports anchor; now with WFXT in Boston
Bill Weir – reporter; now with CNN

Technical information

Subchannels
The station's signal is multiplexed:

Translator
 Garner, Iowa: KAAL/DRT (RF 33)

References

KAAL history

External links
KAAL "ABC 6"
KAAL-DT2 This TV

Television channels and stations established in 1953
1953 establishments in Minnesota
AAL
ABC network affiliates
Hubbard Broadcasting
This TV affiliates
Scripps News affiliates